Madgaon - Ernakulam Superfast Express is a Superfast train of the Indian Railways connecting Madgaon Junction in Goa and Ernakulam junction of Kerala. It is currently being operated with 10215/10216 train numbers on once a week basis.

Service

The 10215/Madgaon - Ernakulam Weekly SF Express has an average speed of 51 km/hr and covers 729 km in 14 hrs 20 mins. 10216/Ernakulam - Madgaon Weekly SF Express has an average speed of 53 km/hr and covers 729 km in 13 hrs 20 mins.

Route and halts

Traction

Both trains are hauled by a Ratlam Diesel Loco Shed based WDM-3A or WDM-3D diesel locomotive.

See also 

 Konkan Railway
 Goa Sampark Kranti Express
 Madgaon railway station
 Ernakulam railway station

References

External links 
 10215 Madgaon Ernakulam Superfast Express
 10216 Ernakulam Madgaon Superfast Express
 10215/Madgaon - Ernakulam (Weekly) SF Express
 10216/Ernakulam - Madgaon Weekly SF Express

Express trains in India
Rail transport in Goa
Rail transport in Karnataka
Rail transport in Kerala
Transport in Kochi
Transport in Margao